Chebbi is a village in Dharwad district of Karnataka, India.

Demographics
As of the 2011 Census of India there were 1,007 households in Chebbi and a total population of 4,536 consisting of 2,316 males and 2,220 females. There were 591 children ages 0-6.

See also
 Dharwad
 Districts of Karnataka

References

Villages in Dharwad district